Club Deportivo Alfonso Ugarte is a Peruvian association football club, located in the city of Puno.The club is the biggest in the city of Puno. It was founded in 1928 and play in the Peruvian Segunda Division which is the second division of the Peruvian league.

History
The club have played at the highest level of Peruvian football on eighteen occasions, from 1974 Torneo Descentralizado until 1991 Torneo Descentralizado when was relegated.

In the 1999 Copa Perú, the club classified to the National Stage, but was eliminated by Universidad Privada Antenor Orrego of Trujillo in the finals.

In the 2001 Copa Perú, the club classified to the National Stage, but was eliminated by Deportivo Bolito of Tacna in the quarterfinals.

The club have played at the Peruvian Segunda División on two occasions, from 2006 until 2007 when was relegated.

In the 2012 Copa Perú, Alfonso Ugarte lost the final against UTC from Cajamarca and classified to the Segunda Division Peruana once again.

International tournaments
In the 1976 Copa Libertadores, in their first international participation, they were faced to the Alianza Lima of Peru, Santa Fe and Millonarios of Colombia by the Group 4 (Colombia, Peru). Being eliminated after drawing 1-1 in Lima with Santa Fe.

Rivalries
Alfonso Ugarte has had a long-standing rivalry with Diablos Rojos and Unión Carolina.

Honours

National
Peruvian Primera División:
Runner-up (1): 1975

Peruvian Segunda División:
Runner-up (1): 2013

Copa Perú:
Runner-up (3): 1999, 2012, 2021

Regional
Región VII:
Winners (3): 1998, 1999, 2001
Runner-up (1): 2000

Región VIII:
Runner-up (1): 2012

Liga Departamental de Puno:
Winners (12): 1971, 1972, 1973, 1994, 1998, 1999, 2000, 2001, 2005, 2012, 2017, 2018
Runner-up (4): 2004, 2008, 2015, 2019

Liga Provincial de Puno:
Winners (2): 2018, 2019
Runner-up (1): 2017

Liga Superior de Puno:
Winners (1): 2012

Performance in CONMEBOL competitions
Copa Libertadores: 1 appearance
1976: First Round

See also
List of football clubs in Peru
Peruvian football league system

External links
Unofficial Website
Fan's Website

 
Football clubs in Peru
Association football clubs established in 1928